Matthew Algie is an independent coffee roaster with registered offices at 16 Lawmoor Road, Glasgow, United Kingdom. The company sells its coffee to coffee shops, bars, restaurants, hotels and businesses across the UK & Ireland and also offers coffee machines for hire - supported by a network of field engineers as well as a range of coffee-related equipment and complementary products through its sister-company Espresso Warehouse. Additionally, Matthew Algie also provide SCA accredited barista training courses, taught via their training campuses based in London, Glasgow & Dublin.

Coffee
Around 90% of  Matthew Algie’s green coffee comes from Fairtrade co-operatives. The company has contributed over $3miilion (US) to community and farm projects through Fairtrade levies to date.  The remainder of its green coffee comes from independent coffee farmers, with whom the company has direct trading relationships.  Matthew Algie uses traditional Probat drum roasting with advanced software and is thought to be the only coffee roaster to use cryogenics to produce its ground coffee.
Matthew Algie sells both filter and espresso coffees, including three triple certified espresso coffees (Fairtrade, Rainforest Alliance and Organic) and the Freshly Roasted espresso range, with the promise of being delivered to customers within 7 days of roasting.

Everything but the Coffee
In 1997 Matthew Algie launched Espresso Warehouse (with the strapline ‘Everything but the Coffee’) to support the growing wave of independent coffee bars. Espresso Warehouse products are sold to coffee retailers in the UK and Ireland as well as through distributors in Europe. Products include tea (Suki tea, loose leaf tea and  Pavilion Garden) hot chocolate (Chocolate Abyss), syrups (Da Vinci) biscuits and cookies (Wooden Spoon and The Fine Cookie Co) and a wide range of barista equipment and coffee bar hardware.

History
Matthew Algie (born 1814 in Greenock, Scotland, died  1906)  was a grocer who sold tea that had been imported to Scotland on the Clyde Clippers. He established Matthew Algie the tea blending and wholesaling business in 1864. For around 80 years, and through two World Wars, the business sold tea and spices to retailers in the Glasgow area. In 1950 the company, then known as Algie’s, started selling coffee to post-war Glasgow, along with vending services. In 1974 “Algie’s” began selling coffee machines for offices, restaurants and hotels, replacing instant coffee with roast and ground coffee.

In the 1980s the business went through a period of rapid expansion, going UK-wide and adding bulk-brew coffee machines for the catering sector to their portfolio. In 1989 the company introduced the first espresso machine to its range. In 1995, Managing Director, David Williamson, a descendant of Matthew Algie, visited Portland Oregon and returned to restructure the company with a view to driving the espresso revolution in the UK. In 1997 Matthew Algie introduced the UK’s first Fairtrade espresso beans, followed in 2004 by the world’s first triple-certified espresso (Fairtrade, Rainforest Alliance and Organic)In 2008, David Williamson died unexpectedly at the age of 42. The David Williamson Rwanda Foundation was set up in David’s memory.

In 2010 the company underwent its biggest rebranding exercise to date.

In 2016 it was sold to Tchibo with the intention to retain the brand and possibly expand it into Tchibo's existing markets in central Europe.

References

HeraldScotland: http://www.heraldscotland.com/business_hq/16956693.glasgow-coffee-roaster-matthew-algie-raises-profits-as-strong-consumer-demand-boosts-turnover/ 
CoffeeBusinessWorld: http://coffeebusinessworld.com/latest-news/tips-for-social-media-success-07-08-2018/
Scotsman: http://www.scotsman.com/business/food-drink-agriculture/matthew-algie-is-all-perked-up-1-3121535
BBC: https://www.bbc.co.uk/news/uk-scotland-scotland-business-24357203
Twin Adapt Now Initiative: https://web.archive.org/web/20131112170355/http://www.twin.org.uk/news/press-release-twin-launches-climate-change-initiative-adapt-now-first-project-funded-ms-and
Education Scotland: https://web.archive.org/web/20131003213543/http://www.educationscotland.gov.uk/video/s/video_tcm4580627.asp
The Grocer: http://www.thegrocer.co.uk/topics/technology-and-supply-chain/matthew-algie-starts-solar-roastery/230261.article
Scotland on Screen: https://archive.today/20131112164800/http://scotlandonscreen.org.uk/database/record.php?usi=007-000-002-395-C
David Williamson Rwanda Foundation: http://www.rwandafoundation.org/
Coffee Kids: https://web.archive.org/web/20131112172120/http://www.coffeekids.org/matthew-algie-at-the-forefront-in-supporting-coffee-growing-families/

External links
Official Matthew Algie website
Official Espresso Warehouse website
Official Matthew Algie Instagram page
Official Matthew Algie Facebook page
Official Matthew Algie Twitter page

Coffee brands
Tea brands in the United Kingdom
Companies based in Glasgow
Drink companies of Scotland